Ondina obliqua is a rare species of sea snail, a marine gastropod mollusk in the family Pyramidellidae, the pyrams and their allies.

Description
The shell reaches a length of 2.5 mm to 5 mm. The very thin, whitish shell has a transparent, glossy appearance. It has a typical intorted protoconch. The teleoconch contains five whorls, marked with fine, close spiral striae, becoming coarser on the base. The suture is deep and oblique. The outer lip is flexuous, retreating, sinuated above. It is smooth within. The columellar tooth shows only a slight obscure fold. There is no umbilicus or a very small umbilical chink.

Distribution
This species occurs in the following locations:
 European waters (from South Scandinavia to the Bay of Biscay)
 Portuguese Exclusive Economic Zone
 Spanish Exclusive Economic Zone
 United Kingdom Exclusive Economic Zone
 Mediterranean Sea
 Atlantic Ocean : Madeira., Canary Islands

References

 Templado, J. and R. Villanueva 2010 Checklist of Phylum Mollusca. pp. 148–198 In Coll, M., et al., 2010. The biodiversity of the Mediterranean Sea: estimates, patterns, and threats. PLoS ONE 5(8):36pp. 
 van Aartsen J. J., 1987 : European Pyramidellidae: III. Odostomia and Ondina, Bollettino Malacologico, 23 (1-4): 1-34

External links
 To Biodiversity Heritage Library (2 publications)
 To CLEMAM
 To Encyclopedia of Life
 To World Register of Marine Species
 

Pyramidellidae
Gastropods described in 1844